Institute for Theoretical Physics may refer to:

 Bogolyubov Institute for Theoretical Physics, National Academy of Sciences of Ukraine, Kiev, Ukraine
 Walter Burke Institute for Theoretical Physics, California Institute of Technology, U.S.
 William I. Fine Theoretical Physics Institute, University of Minnesota, U.S.
 Galileo Galilei Institute for Theoretical Physics, Florence, Italy
 Institute for Theoretical Physics, Copenhagen
 Institute for Theoretical Physics, Utrecht University, The Netherlands
 Kavli Institute for Theoretical Physics, University of California, Santa Barbara, U.S.
 Kavli Institute for Theoretical Physics China, at the Chinese Academy of Sciences, Beijing
 Landau Institute for Theoretical Physics, Moscow, Russia
 Nordic Institute for Theoretical Physics, Stockholm, Sweden
 Perimeter Institute for Theoretical Physics, Waterloo, Ontario, Canada
 Stanford Institute for Theoretical Physics, Stanford University, California, U.S.
 C. N. Yang Institute for Theoretical Physics, Stony Brook University, New York, U.S.
 Yukawa Institute for Theoretical Physics, Kyoto University, Japan
 Zhejiang Institute of Modern Physics, Zhejiang University, Hangzhou, China
 Bhaumik Institute for Theoretical Physics, University of California, Los Angeles, U.S.

See also
 Center for Theoretical Physics (disambiguation)
 Institute of Physics (disambiguation)
 ITP (disambiguation)